Talas Region is a region (oblast) of Kyrgyzstan. Its capital is Talas. It is bordered on the west and north by Jambyl Region of Kazakhstan, on the east by Chüy Region, on the south by Jalal-Abad Region and on the southwest by a finger of Uzbekistan. The resident population of the region was 270,994 as of January 2021. The historic Battle of Talas between the Abbasid Caliphate & the Tang dynasty was fought here, which culminated in an Abbasid victory and led to the Islamization of Central Asia.

Geography
The Talas Region is a U-shaped valley open to the west. The northern border is defined by the Kyrgyz Ala-Too, which also forms the Chuy Region's southern border. At the eastern end, the Talas Ala-Too Range splits off and marks the southern border. The river Talas flows through the center of the valley.  The main highway (A361) enters from the east over the Ötmök Pass (Can become impassible during winter due to weather) and goes down the valley to Taraz in Kazakhstan. Near the valley's mouth at Kyzyl-Adyr, one road goes north toward Taraz and the other south over the Kara-Buura Pass to Jalal-Abad Province.  Before independence most trade links were with Taraz.

Divisions
The Talas Region is divided administratively into one city of regional significance (Talas), and four districts:

There are no cities of district significance or urban-type settlements in the region.

Basic Socio-Economic Indicators

The economically active population of Issyk-Kul Region in 2009 was 98,815, of which 93,499 employed and 5,316 (5.4%) unemployed. 

 Export: 14.6 million US dollars (2008)
 Import: 193.3 million US dollars (2008)
 Direct Foreign Investments: 30,4 million US dollars (in 2008)

Demographics

The population of Talas Region, according to the Population and Housing Census of 2009, amounted to 219.6 thousand (enumerated de facto population) or 226.8 thousand (de jure population). The region's estimated population for the beginning of 2021 was 270,994.

Ethnic composition
According to the 2009 Census, the ethnic composition of the Talas Region (de jure population) was:

References

Works cited
 Laurence Mitchell, Kyrgyzstan, Bradt Travel Guides, 2008

External links

 Flag and Coat of arms of Talas Province. Description. 

 
Regions of Kyrgyzstan